Ghost is the 13th album by English folk singer Kate Rusby, released in August 2014.

Critical reception

Ghost received generally positive reviews from music critics. Writing for The Daily Telegraph, Martin Chilton stated that the album has a "pleasing freshness", partly down to the blending of Stevie Iveson's electric guitar with more traditional folk instrumentation. Uncut's Neil Spencer said that, while the album gives the listener the impression they have heard much of Ghost before, Rusby's "many fans won't mind".

Track listing

References

2014 albums
Kate Rusby albums